Zhao Leji (born 8 March 1957) is a Chinese politician, who is the current chairman of the Standing Committee of the National People's Congress and the third-ranking member of the CCP Politburo Standing Committee.

In his earlier political career, he served as the Communist Party Secretary of Qinghai, the party secretary of Shaanxi, and the head of the Organization Department of the CCP. He entered the CCP Politburo in 2012 and was promoted to the Politburo Standing Committee five years later. Between 2017 and 2022, he was the secretary of the Central Commission for Discipline Inspection, the party's top anti-corruption body.

Early life 
Zhao Leji was born in Xining, Qinghai province. His parents were from Xi'an, Shaanxi province. The family moved to Qinghai as part of the aid the frontiers programs of the Mao years. During the later years of the Cultural Revolution, Zhao went to the countryside to perform manual labour on a commune. After working there for about a year, Zhao returned to the city to become a communications assistant at the Commerce Department of Qinghai province.

Zhao joined the CCP in 1975 and entered Peking University in 1977 as a gongnongbing student; he studied philosophy there until January 1980. He then spent three years teaching at the Qinghai School of Commerce and overseeing the Communist Youth League wing of the provincial department of commerce. In 1985, he was transferred to a Qinghai-based metal products company to be its party secretary. In April 1986, he became deputy head of the provincial department of commerce.

Local careers

Qinghai
Zhao entered the provincial government in 1993, becoming part of the inner circle of then Qinghai party secretary Yin Kesheng. He was then elevated to vice-governor, then CCP Secretary of his hometown Xining. He acceded to the post of governor in 1999 at age 42, becoming the youngest provincial governor in the country at the time. Having 'jumped' several levels in a short period of time, Zhao's upward trajectory began to slow by the turn of the century. Zhao became party secretary of Qinghai in 2003 after having spent nearly five years in the Governor's office. Part of his inability to move to a more economically prosperous and more politically visible province was attributed to his Shaanxi background. He spoke in Shaanxi dialect even at government meetings.

Zhao's tenure in Qinghai was marked by rapid economic growth, and a tripling of the province's GDP from the time he took office as Governor to when he left as party secretary in 2007. It was said that Zhao took a relatively soft approach on ethnic minority issues and took on environmentally conscious investment projects. His achievements in Qinghai were lauded by the party's central leadership.

Shaanxi
In 2007, Zhao was transferred to become party secretary in his parents' home province of Shaanxi, having taken on the top jobs in both his 'native' province and the province of his birth, breaking an unspoken rule in the Communist Party that party secretaries should never hail from the province they are native to. This was seen as an indication of the trust shown to Zhao by the central leadership. In 2008, Shaanxi's GDP growth figures hit 15%, becoming one of only two provincial-level divisions to set sights on GDP growth rates of over 13%. In Shaanxi, Zhao oversaw the expansion and development of the GuanZhong-TianShui(关中-天水) economic belt.

After the 18th National Congress of the CCP in November 2012, he was appointed member of the Politburo and head of the Organization Department of the CCP.

Zhao was a member of the 16th and 17th Central Committee and the 18th Politburo of the CCP.

Top leadership 
Zhao was chosen to be a member of the 19th Politburo Standing Committee, China's top decision-making body, at the 1st Plenary Session of the 19th Central Committee of the CCP on 25 October 2017. In the same Session, he succeeded Wang Qishan to become the Secretary of the Central Commission for Discipline Inspection, the party's highest internal-control institution that has been noted for executing CCP general secretary Xi Jinping's anti-corruption campaign. According to The Wall Street Journal, Zhao "has been taking a largely hands-off approach during his time in office and barely involved in making decisions on investigations".

Following the first plenary session of the 20th CCP Central Committee, Zhao was reappointed to the Politburo Standing Committee, becoming its 4th-ranked member. On 10 March 2023, he was appointed as the chairman of the Standing Committee of the National People's Congress.

Notes

References

External links
Profile

 

1957 births
Living people
Chinese Communist Party politicians from Qinghai
Delegates to the 17th National Congress of the Chinese Communist Party
Delegates to the 18th National Congress of the Chinese Communist Party
Delegates to the 19th National Congress of the Chinese Communist Party
Delegates to the 20th National Congress of the Chinese Communist Party
Delegates to the 10th National People's Congress
Delegates to the 11th National People's Congress
Delegates to the 12th National People's Congress
Delegates to the 13th National People's Congress
Governors of Qinghai
Members of the 16th Central Committee of the Chinese Communist Party
Members of the 17th Central Committee of the Chinese Communist Party
Members of the 18th Politburo of the Chinese Communist Party
Members of the 19th Politburo Standing Committee of the Chinese Communist Party
Members of the 20th Politburo Standing Committee of the Chinese Communist Party
Members of the Secretariat of the Chinese Communist Party
People from Xining
People's Republic of China politicians from Qinghai
Political office-holders in Shaanxi
Secretaries of the Central Commission for Discipline Inspection